The Tarong Power Station is a coal fired power station located on a  site in Tarong in the South Burnett Region near the town of Nanango, in Queensland, Australia. The station has a maximum generating capacity of 1,400 megawatts, generated from four turbines.

Construction and design
The location near Nanango was the preference of the premier of the day, Joh Bjelke-Petersen, out of a total of three possible locations that were considered.
It was decided to build a new power station at Tarong in 1978, with work beginning in the following year. Initially it was expecting to be operating by October 1985 but this date was brought forward by 17 months to cover the expected growth in demand.  1 Unit was commissioned in May 1984, with 2 Unit following exactly 12 months later.  3 Unit was commissioned in February 1986, and finally 4 Unit was commissioned just 9 months later in November 1986.  Thus the accelerated construction program included not only bringing forward the dates, but also compressing the timeline.

The design included Queensland's first hyperbolic natural draught cooling towers which rise to 116.5 m.  The power station has one chimney which is 20 m in diameter and rises 210 m. There are two control rooms. The total construction cost including water supply facilities was A$1,230 million.

Stanwell decided in 2021 to install a 150 MW grid battery at Tarong.  Commencing in 2023, the battery will add approximately two hours of storage to the facility.

Emissions
The power station was the site for a pilot project which had been expected to reduce emissions by 1000 tonnes per year by collected carbon dioxide from flue gases. The project was developed by CSIRO and launched in 2010.

A second trial to capture greenhouse gas emissions was conducted by MBD Energy. The technology being trialled collected carbon dioxide and pumped it into waste water where it synthesised oil-rich algae into edible seaweed products or oils. Research measured performance of certain bacteria types.

Demand reduction
In October 2012, Stanwell announced plans to shut down two generating units for two years. The electricity market was oversupplied and wholesale electricity prices were relatively low. The scaling down of operations resulted in the loss of employment for some workers. Both units have since been successfully restarted.

Return to service
Because of higher natural gas prices in 2014 power generators turned to coal-fired power. In July 2014, one of two units shut down in 2012 returned to service.  The recommissioning task was a first for a turbine of that type and took 20,000 hours to complete. The second turbine is expected to be operating by 2015.

See also

Fossil fuel power plant
Stanwell Power Station

References

External links
Stanwell
Incident at Tarong Power Station. 29 November 2015.

Coal-fired power stations in Queensland
Wide Bay–Burnett
Energy infrastructure completed in 1984
South Burnett Region
Power stations in Queensland
1984 establishments in Australia